Bastrop Independent School District is a public school district in Bastrop, Texas, United States. The district serves the communities of Bastrop, Camp Swift, Cedar Creek, Circle D-KC Estates, Paige, Red Rock, Rockne, Wyldwood, and other rural areas of Bastrop County.

Governance
In the 2018-2019 school year, the superintendent was Barry Edwards.

Finances
As of the 2018-2019 school year, the appraised valuation of property in the district was $3,484,178,500.00. The maintenance tax rate was $0.104 and the bond tax rate was $0.044 per $100 of appraised valuation.

Academic achievement
In 2017-18, the school district was rated "Met Standard District" by the Texas Education Agency.

Schools
In the 2018-2019 school year, the district had students in 15 schools.

Regular instructional

High Schools (grades 9-12)
Bastrop High School
Cedar Creek High School 
Colorado River Collegiate Academy
Middle Schools (grades 7-8)
Bastrop Middle
Cedar Creek Middle
Intermediate Schools (grades 5-6)
Bastrop Intermediate
Cedar Creek Intermediate
Elementary schools (early childhood education- grade 4)
Bluebonnet Elementary
Cedar Creek Elementary
Emile Elementary
Lost Pines Elementary
Mina Elementary
Red Rock Elementary

Alternative instructional
Genesis High School (grades 9-12)

DAEP instructional
Bastrop County Juvenile Boot Camp (grades 4-12)
Gateway School (grades 6-12)

Former schools
Emile High School, a former segregated school, served African-American students from 1893 to 1969.  It closed in 1969, when the school district integrated.

See also

List of school districts in Texas

References

External links
Bastrop ISD
 

School districts in Bastrop County, Texas